Kurunji Malar is a Tamil soap opera that aired on Kalaignar TV. It aired Monday through Friday at 9:00PM IST. The show stars Vijay babu, Aishwarya, Sai Latha and Nithiya. The show last aired on 25 September 2014 and ended with 240 episodes.

The channel started repeat airs of this serial on 23 November 2015 and aired Monday through Friday at 12:30PM IST.

Cast
 Vijay babu
 Aishwarya as Kalpana
 Sai Latha
 Nithiya 
 Rajasekhar
 Sanjey
 Kumaresan
 Nesan
 Piraksh
 Meenakshi

References

External links
 

Kalaignar TV television series
2013 Tamil-language television series debuts
2014 Tamil-language television series endings
Tamil-language television shows
2015 Tamil-language television series debuts
2016 Tamil-language television series endings